The Coal Bowl is an American college football game between Pennsylvania Western University California and Indiana University of Pennsylvania. The two universities, both members of the Pennsylvania State System of Higher Education and the Pennsylvania State Athletic Conference (PSAC). The two universities first competed in 1918. The name was added to the rivalry in 2009. The winner will earn the Coal Miners Pail Trophy, sponsored by the Pennsylvania Coal Association.

The trophy was established by brothers Barry "Buck" and Bob Lippencott. Buck played football at Indiana (IUP) and Bob played at California, competing against each other in 1963 and 1964. The brothers made a donation to their universities to establish an athletic scholarship. In addition, proceeds from sponsorship of the Pennsylvania Coal Association will be split between the two schools.

Game results

See also  
 List of NCAA college football rivalry games

References

College football rivalries in the United States
Pennsylvania State Athletic Conference
California Vulcans football
IUP Crimson Hawks football
American football in Pennsylvania
College sports in Pennsylvania
1918 establishments in Pennsylvania
Recurring sporting events established in 1918